Margaret E. Poague House is a historic home located near Lexington, Rockbridge County, Virginia. It was built about 1847, and is a two-story, three-bay Greek Revival style brick dwelling.  It sits banked into a hillside and has a standing seam metal gable roof and interior end chimneys. The property also includes a contributing early-20th century gate pillar.

It was listed on the National Register of Historic Places in 2007.

References

Houses on the National Register of Historic Places in Virginia
Greek Revival houses in Virginia
Houses completed in 1847
Houses in Rockbridge County, Virginia
National Register of Historic Places in Rockbridge County, Virginia
1847 establishments in Virginia
U.S. Route 11